Tennis is highly popular in Spain, and the country has produced several tennis players with international careers.

Spain has won the Davis Cup six times (2000, 2004, 2008, 2009, 2011, 2019) and the Billie Jean King Cup (formerly Fed Cup) five times (1991, 1993, 1994, 1995, 1998).

Rafael Nadal is regarded as the greatest Spanish player of all time. He has won an all-time record 22 Grand Slam men's singles titles, the most in tennis history. He has won the French Open a record 14 times, between 2005 and 2022. After defeating then-world No. 1 Roger Federer in 2008, Nadal claimed the Wimbledon title in a historic final, having won the tournament twice thus far. In 2009, he became the first Spaniard win the Australian Open, a feat he repeated at the 2022 Australian Open. After defeating Novak Djokovic in the 2010 US Open final, he became the first man in history to win majors on clay, grass, and hard courts in a calendar year (Surface Slam), and the first Spaniard to complete a Career Grand Slam, which he has achieved twice in singles (one of four men in history to do so). In addition, Nadal is one of two men to achieve the Career Golden Slam in singles and a two-time Olympic gold medalist, winning the singles event at the 2008 Beijing Olympics and the doubles event at the 2016 Rio Olympics.

Spain has produced several other world No. 1 players; Arantxa Sánchez Vicario (a 3-time French Open champion in 1989, 1994 and 1998, and 1994 US Open champion), Carlos Moyá (1998 French Open champion), Juan Carlos Ferrero (2003 French Open champion), Garbiñe Muguruza (2016 French Open and 2017 Wimbledon champion) and Carlos Alcaraz (2022 US Open).

Other Grand Slam champions are Manuel Santana (1961 and 1964 French Open, 1966 Wimbledon and 1965 US Open champion), Sergi Bruguera (1993 and 1994 French Open champion), Andrés Gimeno (1972 French Open champion), Manuel Orantes (1975 US Open champion), Conchita Martínez (1994 Wimbledon champion), and Albert Costa (2002 French Open champion).

Tournaments held in Spain on the men's tour every year include the Madrid Masters, Barcelona, and Mallorca. Madrid Masters is also contested by women in the WTA Tour.

List of Spanish tennis players (Open Era only) 
Only includes players ranked in the top 50. Bold names indicate currently active players.

Men

Women

Grand Slam performances of Spanish tennis players 

Only includes players who have reached at least a Grand Slam quarterfinal

Spanish tennis achievements timeline

External links